Martin Grzimek (born 1950) is a German author. He was born in Trutzhain. Having spent a number of years living and working in South America and the United States, he now resides in a village near Heidelberg. His work that raised the most interest is Shadowlife, a near-future mystery in which the nature of book itself is questioned. Grzimek is a member of International PEN has won a number of literary prizes.

Works

 Berger, 1980
 Stillstand des Herzens,  1982 (translated as Heartstop: Three Stories by Breon Mitchell)
 Trutzhain,  1984
 Die Beschattung,  1989  (translated as Shadowlife by Breon Mitchell)
 Shadowlife, 1991
 El factor tropical, 1992
 Feuerfalter,  1992
 Ein Bärenleben,  1995 (with Marcus Herrenberger)
 Mostar – Skizzen und Splitter,  1995
 Von einem, der verzweifelt versucht, sich zu verlieben,  1995
 Rudi bärenstark, 1998 (with Marcus Herrenberger)
 Das Austernfest,  2004
 Die unendliche Straße,  2005

Awards
1980 Hermann-Hesse-Preis
1981 Rauris Literature Prize
1982 Literature award of the Kulturkreis der Deutschen Wirtschaft
1993 One year scholarship for writers from the Ministerium für Wissenschaft und Kunst des Landes Baden-Württemberg
1993 Deutscher Krimi Preis (second place) for "Feuerfalter".
1993 Friedrich-Glauser-Preis
2001 Scholarship from Künstlerhaus Edenkoben
2012 Friedrich-Gerstäcker-Preis

Literature
Klaus Hoffer, "Diese schreckliche Begierde, eine Beziehung herzustellen. Laudatio auf M.G.s Roman Berger," Manuskripte 21, H. 74 (1981), pp. 30–2.

External links
 Biography in German
 Literature Workshop in US

1950 births

Living people
German male writers